Proablepharus is a genus of lizards in the subfamily Eugongylinae of the family Scincidae. The genus is endemic to Australia.

Species
Two species are recognized as being valid.

Proablepharus reginae (Glauert, 1960) – western soil-crevice skink 
Proablepharus tenuis (Broom, 1896) – Broom's small skink, northern soil-crevice skink

References

Further reading

Fuhn IE (1969). "The “polyphyletic” origin of the genus Ablepharus (Reptilia: Scincidae). A case of parallel evolution". Zeitschrift für Zoologische Systematik und Evolutionforschung 7: 67–76. (Proablepharus, new genus).

 
Lizard genera
Skinks of Australia
Taxa named by Ion Eduard Fuhn